Affect may refer to:
 Affect (education)
 Affect (linguistics), attitude or emotion that a speaker brings to an utterance
 Affect (philosophy)
 Affect (psychology), the experience of feeling or emotion
 Affect display, signs of emotion, such as facial expression, vocalization, and posture
 Affect theory
 Affective science, the scientific study of emotion
 Affective computing, an area of research in computer science aiming to understand the emotional state of users
 Reduced affect display, a.k.a. emotional blunting or affective flattening, a reduction in emotional reactivity
 Pseudobulbar affect, a.k.a. labile affect, the unstable display of emotion
 Affect (rhetoric), the responsive, emotional feeling that precedes cognition
 Affected accent; see Accent (sociolinguistics)
 Affect (company), a defunct Japanese video game developer

See also
 Affection (disambiguation)
 Affekt, a German term used in the doctrine of the affections, a theory in the aesthetics of music
 ... (sorted)
 ... (unsorted)
 Effect (disambiguation)